Kolhapur municipality was established on 12 October 1954. Establishment of municipality initiated planning of modern Kolhapur city of Maharashtra state.
Due to Maharashtra government anaunces the 15% growth in the municipal corporations seats there was a 92 seats from 81 seats in Kolhapur municipal corporation. Municipal Corporation mechanism in India was introduced during British Rule with formation of municipal corporation in Madras (Chennai) in 1688, later followed by municipal corporations in Bombay (Mumbai) and Calcutta (Kolkata) by 1762. Kolhapur Municipal Corporation is headed by Mayor of city and governed by Commissioner. Kolhapur Municipal Corporation has been formed with functions to improve the infrastructure of town.

Revenue sources 

The following are the Income sources for the corporation from the Central and State Government.

Revenue from taxes 
Following is the Tax related revenue for the corporation.

 Property tax.
 Profession tax.
 Entertainment tax.
 Grants from Central and State Government like Goods and Services Tax.
 Advertisement tax.

Revenue from non-tax sources 

Following is the Non Tax related revenue for the corporation.

 Water usage charges.
 Fees from Documentation services.
 Rent received from municipal property.
 Funds from municipal bonds.

Municipal elections

Elections 2022

Election 2015

The results of Election 2015 are as follows.

The period from 1941 to 1944 was the golden period in the history of municipality. There were major changes in various fields. In the three-year election of March 1941, local self-government was established. A control board of three persons i.e. Bhai Madhavrao Bagal, Seth Govindrao Korgaonkar, Shri Ratnappa Kumbhar, was appointed in it. Motto of this board "To reserve the society without any discrimination. There is no linking of this board to any political organization. Whatever rights are confessed by government to citizens should be utilized fully is prime duty of the board." is declared in the board's manifesto.

Progress of Corporation

The period from 1954 to 71 was the period of speedy growth of Kolhapur city. It is seen that the municipality moved towards corporation status during this period. It is seen from records that in 1960, there were 44 members in municipality. Out of them 37 were from general category, 3 from reserved backward category and 4 from women reserved category. The municipal working was based on administrative triangle of general body meeting, chief officer and standing committee. Engineers, health officers, account officers, supervisors, octroi and tax officers used to help Chief officer. In 1956- c57, the annual income of municipality was Rs. 33,21,213 through taxes and other means, and the expenditure was Rs. 29,29,161. This indicates the growing business of municipality. During this period network of roads was constructed in the city. New bridges were constructed as per requirement. Water supply was made more effective. New markets, gardens were constructed to make the city more beautiful.

Effective growth in industrialization in Kolhapur resulted in starting a new industrial era, due to devoted efforts of Y. P. Pawar, Mhadba Mistri, Tatya Shinde, and Late. Rambhai Samani. The large area of Udyam nagari was busy in preparing machinery and spare parts. The products from Kolhapur Industrial Estate started getting exported to number of Asian and African companies. Municipality helped the growth of industry in many ways.

During this period only Shivaji University was established at the hands of Dr. Radhakrishnan in 1962. Thus municipality helped in restructuring industry and education. In December 1972 the municipal council was dissolved.

Era of elected body of members
In August 1978, the first people elected corporation was formed in true sense. During this period, Shri Babasaheb Kasabekar (1978–79), Shri Nanasaheb Yadav, (1979–80), Late Shri D. N. Kanerkar (1980), Baburao Parkhe (1980-81), Prof. Shri Subhash Rane were mayors and they contributed significantly in the development of Kolhapur city.

References

External links

Kolhapur
Municipal corporations in Maharashtra
1954 establishments in Bombay State